C. Viruthachalam (25 April 1906 – 30 June 1948), better known by the pseudonym Pudhumaipithan (also spelt as Pudumaipithan or Puthumaippiththan), was one of the most influential and revolutionary writers of Tamil fiction. His works were characterized by social satire, progressive thinking and outspoken criticism of accepted conventions. Contemporary writers and critics found it difficult to accept his views and his works were received with extreme hostility. He as an individual and his works have been extensively reviewed and debated for over sixty years since his death. His influence has been accepted and appreciated by the present day writers and critics of Tamil fiction. In 2002, the Government of Tamil Nadu nationalised the works of Pudumaippithan.

Life and career
Pudhumaipithan was born in Thiruppadirippuliyur (Cuddalore district). His early education was obtained in places like Gingee, Kallakurichi and Tindivanam. He completed his Bachelor of Arts degree from Tirunelveli Hindu college in 1931. In the same year he married Kamala and moved to Madras.

His career as a writer began in 1933 with an essay "Gulabjaan Kaadhal" (Love for Gulab jamun) published in the magazine Gandhi. His first short story "Aatrangarai Pillaiyaar" (Pillaiyaar on the river bank) was published in 1934 in "Manikodi" and from then on his short stories appeared regularly in it. His short stories appeared in a number of magazines like Kalaimakal, Jothi, Sudantira Chanku, Oozhiyan and Thamizh Mani and the annual issue of Dina Mani. He worked briefly as a sub editor at Oozhiyan and later at Dina Mani. In 1943, he left Dina Mani to join Dinasari. In 1940, his book "Pudhumaipithan Kadhaigal"(The stories of Pudhumaipithan), an anthology of his short stories was published. He slowly ventured into the world of Tamil cinema and worked as a scriptwriter in the films Avvaiyaar and KaamaValli. In 1945, he started "Parvatha Kumari Productions" and made an abortive attempt at producing a film called "Vasanthavalli". While working for the movie "Raja Mukthi", in Pune he contracted tuberculosis. He died on 5 May 1948 at Thiruvananthapuram.

Works and themes

Pudumaippithan's active writing period was less than 15 years (1934–46) in which he wrote nearly 100 short stories, an equal number of essays on a variety of subjects, 15 poems, a few plays and scores of book reviews. His writings gave him a reputation as a maverick. His works were influenced by the French short story writer Guy de Maupassant among others. The subjects he wrote on and the characters he chose to portray were completely new to Tamil fiction. He felt that Tamil literature had been crippled by unspoken conventions and openly criticized those who adhered to them. In one of his essays he expressed his displeasure as:

He was unfazed by the hostile reception that his works received from contemporary writers and critics alike. Dismissing his critics, he wrote :

To voice his views he used a wide range of characters, both common – husbands wives, students, children, rickshaw pullers, villagers, beggars, whores, oppressed people, saints, revolutionaries; and uncommon – God, ghosts, monsters, hospital beds. Some of his favourite themes were – conflicts between emotion and reason, Hindu religion – its rules, rituals and laws, caste system, struggles for survival and oppression of women in the Indian society.

Short stories

Pudumaipithan is primarily known for his short stories. Of the 108 stories that have been identified as works of Pudumaipithan, only 48 had been published in book form during his lifetime. Most of his works were published in magazines like Manikodi, Kalaimagal, Jothi, Sudantira Chanku, Oozhiyan, Thamizh Mani, Dina mani, Dina Sari and Nandan. The rest have been published posthumously in various anthologies, the latest one being in 2000. He belonged to the Manikodi movement (named for the magazine) which flourished in 1930s. Ku. Paa Rajakoopaalan, B. S. Ramaiya and Va. Ramasamy were his contemporaries in the Manikodi movement.

Translations
He was also a prolific translator of literary works from other languages into Tamil. He translated around 50 short stories, including the works of Molière, Kay Boyle, Maxim Gorky, Sinclair Lewis, Ernst Toller, William Shakespeare, E. M. Delafield, William Saroyan, E. V. Lucas, Moshe Smilansky, Robert Louis Stevenson, Bret Harte, John Galsworthy, Aleksandr Kuprin, Anton Chekhov, Franz Kafka, Ilya Ehrenburg, Guy de Maupassant, Valery Bryusov, Anatole France, Leonid Andreyev, Henrik Ibsen, Nathaniel Hawthorne, Edgar Allan Poe, Robert Murray Gilchrist, Frances Bellerby, Bjørnstjerne Bjørnson, Leonard Strong, Jack London, Peter Egge, Mikhail Aleksandrovich Sholokhov, Thomas Wolfe and James Hanley. He had strong views on doing translations and adaptations. He equated adaptations to literary theft and held the view that translation was the proper way to bring literary works of other languages to Tamil. In 1937, he was involved in a literary feud with Kalki Krishnamurthy on the issue of translations vs adaptations

Poems
Pudumaipithan wrote about fifteen poems in total. His first published poem was Thiru Angila arasanga thondaradipodi azhwar vaibhavam, which appeared in 1934. Most of his poems were written as letters to his friend T. M. Chidambara Ragunathan in the form of Venpas. The fifteen poems were published posthumously in 1954. Like his short stories, his poems are full of wit and satire. The most famous of his poems is the abusive limerick Moonavarunasalamae written in review of a book on Tamil prose, which failed to mention the Manikodi movement.

Political books
Pudumaipithan's political orientation was socialist. Among his political essays and books, four are considered important – Fascist Jatamuni (a biography of Benito Mussolini), Gapchip Durbar (a biography of Adolf Hitler), Stalinukku Theriyum and Adhikaram yarukku (both endorsing communism and policies of Joseph Stalin). All the four books contain scathing indictments of fascism and a general agreement with Stalinist policies.

Writing style

Pudhumaipithan was the first Tamil writer to successfully use a dialect of Tamil other than that of Chennai or Tanjore. Most of his characters spoke the Tirunelveli dialect. His stories were set either in Madras or in Tirunelveli, the two places where he spent considerable portions of his life. His writing style had a mixture of colloquial and classical words. Gentle satire even while handling complicated and serious situations was his hallmark. He used harsh language while arguing with his literary opponents like Kalki Krishnamoorthy and wrote insulting limericks in his book reviews.

Plagiarism and other criticisms
Pudumaippithan has been accused by some of his contemporaries and later critics of having plagiarized from the works of Maupassant. Chief among the accusers were his contemporaries Pe. Ko. Sundararajan (Chitty) and So. Sivapathasundaram and literary critic Kaarai Krishnamoorthy. Pudumaipitthan himself published the short story  "Tamil Paditha Pondaati" (The wife who knew Tamil) with the foreword that it was based on Maupassant's work. Pudumaipithan's biographer T.M. Chidambara Ragunathan has identified the stories samadhi, Nondi, Bayam, Kolaikaran kai, Nalla velaikaran and Andha muttal venu as adaptations of Maupassant's works and the story Pithukuli as the adaptation of a Robert Browning poem. A few more stories like Doctor Sampath, Naane Kondren, Yaar Kurravali and Thekkangandrugal have also been tentatively identified as possible adaptations. His defenders (including Ragunathan and historian A R Venkatachalapathy) have argued that those were adaptations and not plagiarizations. Pudumaipithan did not publish the short stories which have been identified (except Tamil Paditha Pondaati) as adaptations when he was alive. They were published posthumously only after 1953. Thus, the defenders infer he would have acknowledged them as adaptations if he had published them himself (as he did in the case of Tamil Paditha Pondaati). Further they contend Pudhumaipithan did not know French and during his lifetime the other Maupassant stories he has been accused of plagiarizing had not been translated into English. In their view, Pudumaipithan has had to suffer the accusation of plagiarism due to the callousness of his posthumous publishers. All of Pudhumaipithan's adaptations were written before 1937, when he became involved in a literary feud with Kalki Krishnamurthy about adapting works from other languages. During the feud he wrote biting essays equating adaptations with literary theft.

He has been criticized for just raising uncomfortable issues and not proposing any solutions for them. He had responded by pointing out that his job was only raising the issue and leaving the reader to figure out the solution. There have also been minor criticisms regarding his writing style like his digressing from the plot due to elaborate descriptions of environment and characters. Recently, Tamil critic A. Marx has criticised Pudumaipithan's portrayal of Dalits, Christians, Maravars and meat eaters as derogatory.

Pseudonyms
Pudhumaipithan wrote under different pseudonyms, but the name "Pudhumaipithan" was the one that became famous. He himself preferred the name as he felt that this name was partially responsible for the appeal of his stories. Some of his other pseudonyms were So.Vi, Rasamattam, Mathru, Koothan, Nandhan, Oozhiyan, Kabhali, Sukraachari and Iraval visirimadippu. For publishing poems he used the pseudonym Velur Ve. Kandasamy Pillai. Due to the accusation of plagiarism his pseudonyms have been extensively researched. T.M. Chidambara Ragunathan in his pudhumaipithan biography Pudumaippithan kathaigal: sila vimarsanangalum vishamangalum, has advanced the theory that all the works published under the name of "Nandhan" are adaptive works rather than original ones.

Bibliography

Poems

 Thiru Angila arasanga thondaradipodi azhwar vaibhavam
 Moona arunasalamae mooda
 Inaiyarra India
 Sellum vazhi iruttu

Political books

 Fascist Jatamuni
 Kapchip Darbar
 Stalinukku Theriyum
 Athikaram Yaarukku

Short stories

 Ahalyai
 Sellammal
 Gopalayyangarin Manaivi
 Idhu machine yugam
 Kadavulin Pradhinidhi
 Kadavulum kandasami pillayaum
 Padapadappu
 Oru naal kalindadhu
 Theruvilakku
 Kalanum Kizhaviyum
 Ponnagaram
 Irandu ulagangal
 Aanmai
 Athangarai Pillayar
 Abinav snap
 Andru iravu
 Andha muttal venu
 Avadharam
 Brammarakshas
 Bayam
 Doctor Sampath
 Eppodum mudivilae inbam
 Gnanagugai
 Gopalapuram
 Ilakkiya mamma nayanar puranam
 Indha paavi
 Kaali kovil
 Kapatakuram
 Kalyani
 Kanavu penn
 Kaanchanai
 Kannan kuzhal
 Karuchidaivu
 Kattilai vittu iranga kadhai
 Kattil pesugiradhu
 Kavandanum Kamamum
 Kayirravu
 Kodukkapuli maram
 Kolaikaran kai
 Konra sirippu
 Kuppanin kanavu
 Kurravaki yaar
 Maayavalai
 Magamasaanam
 Manakugai oviyangal
 Mana nizhal
 Motcham
 Naane kondren
 Nalla velaikaran
 Nambikkai
 Nanmai bayakkumenin
 Naasakara kumgal
 Nigumbalai
 Ninaivu padhai
 Nirvigarpa samadhi
 Nisamum ninaippum
 Nyayam
 Nyayamthan
 Nondi
 Oppandam
 Oru kolai anubavam
 Paal vannam pillai
 Parimudhal
 Paattiyin deepavali
 Pithukuli
 Poikaal kudhirai
 Poosanikkai ambi
 Puratchi manappanmai
 Pudhiya koondu
 Pudhiya kandapuranam
 Pudhiya nandhan
 Pudhiya oli
 Ramanathanin kaditham
 Saba vimosanam
 Salaram
 Samaavin thavaru
 Sayangala mayakkam
 Samaadhi
 Samiyarum kuzhandhaiyum seedaiyum
 Sanappan kozhi
 Sangu tharmam
 Selvam
 Sevvai dhosham
 Sirpiyin naragam
 Sithan pokku
 Sithi
 Sivasidambara sevugam
 Sonna sol
 Subbaya pillayin kadhalgal
 Thani oruvanukku
 Thega kandrugal
 Thirandha jannal
 Thirukkural kumaresa pillai
 Thirukkural seidha thirukoothu
 Thyaga moorthi
 Thunba keni
 Unarchiyin adimaigal
 Ubadesam
 Vaada malli
 Vaazhkai
 Vazhi
 Velipoochu
 Vedhalam sonna kadhai
 Vibareedha aasai
 Vinayaga Chathurthi

Translations

Ashatapoorthi
Aattukuttithani
Amma
Andha paiyan
Ashtamasithi
Asisriyar Araichi
Adhikaalai
Bali
Sithravadhai
Daimon kanda unmai
Ini
Indha pal vivakaram
Ishtasithi
Kadhal kadhai
Kanavu
Kalappumanam
Karaiyil kanda mugam
Kizhavi
Latheefa
Magalukku manam seidhu vaithargal
Manimandhira theevu
Maniosai
Markheem
Milees
Mudhalum mudivum
Nadakakaari
Natchathira ilavarasi
Om santhi santhi
Kattukathai
Oruvanum oruthiyum
Paithiyakaari
Palingusilai
Balthazar
Poi
Poochandiyin magal
Rajya ubadhai
Roger melvinin eemachadangu
Saaraya peepai
Sagothararkal
Samathuvam
Scheherazade kadhai solli
Siritha mugakaaran
Sooniyakaari
Suvaril vazhi
Thayilla kuzhandaikal
Thayal machine
Thanthai mugarkarrum udavi
Deivam kudutha varam
Desiya geetham
Deivathukku marru
Thuravi
Uyir Aasai
Veedu thirumbal
Aei padagukaara
Yaathirai
Emanai emaarra
Yutha devadhaiyin thirumuga mandalam

See also
 List of Indian writers

References

External links

 

Tamil-language writers
1906 births
1948 deaths
People from Cuddalore district